Hurley Tarver (born November 30, 1975) is a former American football defensive back. He played college football at the University of Central Oklahoma and attended Western Hills High School in Benbrook, Texas. He was a member of the San Francisco 49ers, Cleveland Browns, Scottish Claymores, Dallas Cowboys, Las Vegas Outlaws, Green Bay Packers, Tampa Bay Storm, Chicago Rush, Toronto Argonauts and Las Vegas Gladiators.

Early years
Tarver participated in football, basketball and track and field for the Western Hills High School Cougars. He was a first-team all-district and all-American safety. He was also the triple jump all-district champion.

College career
Tarver played college football for the Central Oklahoma Bronchos. He recorded 57 tackles, 2 interceptions, one fumble recovery and 9 passes defended his senior year. He was also  an all-regional second-team and all-American honorable mention selection. He recorded 62 tackles, 4 interception and 12 passes defended his junior year.

Professional career

San Francisco 49ers
Tarver signed with the San Francisco 49ers in April 1998 after going undrafted in the 1998 NFL Draft. He was released by the 49ers on August 25, 1998.

Cleveland Browns
Tarver was a member of the Cleveland Browns in 1999 before being released on July 1, 1999.

Dallas Cowboys
Tarver signed with the Dallas cowboys on August 9, 2000. He was released by the Cowboys on August 27, 2000.

Las Vegas Outlaws
Tarver was drafted by the Las Vegas Outlaws in the fourteenth round with the 108th pick of the 2001 XFL Draft.

Green Bay Packers
Tarver was signed by the Green Bay Packers on April 20, 2001. He was released by the Packers on June 5, 2001. He re-signed with the Packers on Augusta, 2001. He was released by the Packers on September 2 and signed to the team's practice squad on September 3, 2001. Tarver was released by the Packers on December 27, 2001.

He re-signed with the Packers on April 15, 2002. He was released by the Packers on September 2, 2002. Tarver re-signed with the team on January 1, 2003.

Tampa Bay Storm
Tarver signed with the Tampa Bay Storm on December 31, 2002. He was placed on recallable waivers by the Storm on January 30, 2004.

Chicago Rush
Tarver was signed by the Chicago Rush on February 19, 2004. He was released by the Rush on June 2, 2004.

Toronto Argonauts
Tarver signed with the Toronto Argonauts on September 20, 2004. He was released by the Argonauts on June 13, 2005.

Las Vegas Gladiators
Tarver was signed by the Las Vegas Gladiators on March 17, 2005.

References

External links
Just Sports Stats

1975 births
Living people
American football defensive backs
Canadian football defensive backs
African-American players of American football
African-American players of Canadian football
Central Oklahoma Bronchos football players
San Francisco 49ers players
Cleveland Browns players
Dallas Cowboys players
Green Bay Packers players
Las Vegas Gladiators players
Scottish Claymores players
Las Vegas Outlaws (XFL) players
Tampa Bay Storm players
Chicago Rush players
Toronto Argonauts players
Players of American football from Fort Worth, Texas
21st-century African-American sportspeople
20th-century African-American sportspeople